Chunhyang-jeon (춘향전, 春香傳 "The Story of Chunhyang") is a 1950 Korean-language opera by Hyun Jae-Myung (현제명) a South Korean composer. This is generally regarded as the first western-style Korean opera. During the Japanese colonial period, he, like most Koreans, was given a Japanese name based on his Korean one (玄山濟明 Kuroyama Sumiaki). The plot concerns a girl Sun Chunhyang, and is based on the original Chunhyangjeon, a 17th-century novel telling one of the best known traditional love stories of Korea, based on the pansori Chunhyangga.

References 

1950 operas
Operas based on novels
Operas
Korean-language operas
Works based on The Tale of Chunhyang